"Family Limitation" is the sixth episode of the first season of the HBO television series Boardwalk Empire, which premiered October 24, 2010. It was written by supervising producer Howard Korder and directed by executive producer Tim Van Patten.

Plot 
Two of the D'Alessio brothers rob one of Nucky's bagmen on the Boardwalk in broad daylight. Because the thieves are perceived to be Italian, Nucky suspects Luciano is behind it. Margaret asks Mrs. McGarry, the chairwoman of the Temperance League, for advice on whether to accept Nucky's offer to move in with him. Though clearly uncomfortable with Nucky not offering her his hand in marriage first, Mrs. McGarry advises Margaret to do as she sees fit and gives her a Sanger pamphlet on birth control. Luciano, who is sleeping with Gillian, confides in her his frequent problem with impotence caused by recurring gonorrhea. He is informed by Rothstein via a surprise telephone call that Gillian is not Jimmy's wife, but rather his mother.

In Chicago, Jimmy advises Torrio against ordering a "retreat" from their interests in Sheridan's territory, since it will only make them look weak. He also spends more time with Capone and his family, inadvertently discovering that Al's son Sonny, whom he passes off as an "idiot", is actually deaf. After reconciling with Sheridan at his hotel, the hotel's coat checker (Capone's wife) hands Jimmy and Capone concealed guns, which they use to whack Sheridan and his men. Jimmy is effused with praise from Torrio for organizing the ambush, which angers Capone and leads him and Jimmy to trade insults over Jimmy's weak nerves and Capone lying about serving in the war. Capone later visits Jimmy and gifts him a package of steaks; the two men make up and Capone reveals his fear over how Sonny's disability will affect his future. Jimmy encourages Capone not to give up hope that modern medicine might find a way to help his son.

An emboldened Margaret moves into Nucky's home, and even quits her job at the dress shop after getting belittled by Lucy, mocking her as a brainless tart whom Nucky will eventually grow bored of. Nucky invites her to join him for a magic show later that evening, but when Mayor Hague asks him to dinner so that the two men can discuss politics and the road financing bill, he blows her off without a second thought. Margaret then learns from one of her neighbors, Annabelle, that it isn't unusual for a powerful man in Atlantic City to keep a "concubine" in his household.

Eli brings in Luciano and roughs him up; despite Luciano arguing that he knows nothing about the theft, Nucky sends him away with a warning not to mess with his people. Van Alden's superiors refuse to give him the resources to build a case against Nucky for lack of evidence, and reprimand him for being lax in his duties as a Bureau agent. That night, while going through Margaret's records, he finds a photograph of a 16-year-old Margaret in her immigration file. He then performs self-mortification with a leather strap from his suitcase to cure himself of his lust for her.

Reception

Critical reception 
IGN gave the episode a score of 8.5 enjoying the relationship between Al and Jimmy: "Another highlight is the relationship between Al and Jimmy, as they rise up the ranks of the Torrio crime family. The two debate the difference between 'buddy' and 'accomplice' as Jimmy plans how to take out Sheridan. During this time, Jimmy, a war veteran, calls out Al on his bullshit war record, which in turn makes Al look like he is overcompensating for being nothing more than a thug in a nice suit. These exchanges prove that Al and Jimmy may have been friends once, but are on a path to being something much worse as their underworld careers advance."

The A.V. Club gave it a B+ rating.

Ratings 
"Family Limitation" slipped back to a 1.2 adults 18–49 rating after last week's 1.3 rating. The episode had a total of 2.812 million viewers.

References

External links 
 "Family Limitation"  at HBO
 

2010 American television episodes
Boardwalk Empire episodes
Television episodes directed by Tim Van Patten